Luca Scarsini (born 14 July 1993) is an Italian rugby union player. His usual position is as a Prop and he currently plays for Lyons Piacenza in Top12

Born as a loose-head prop, he now plays as tight-head prop, behind able to play in both scrum sides. Growing up in Rugby Udine youth team, he stands out so that he is called to attend the “Ivan Francescato” Academy in Tirrenia, disputing the Six Nations Under 20s Championship and the World Rugby Under 20 Trophy with the Italy national under-20 rugby team. After the tournament, in the summer of 2012, he moves to Brescia region, earning his first Italian Championship with Rugby Calvisano. In 2014 he contributes to the conquest of yet another Italian Championship of Excellence and participates in the World Rugby Tbilisi Cup 2014 with Italia Emergenti.
During the summer of 2016 he moves to Petrarca Padova and, in 2018, he strongly contributes to the victory of the Italian champion title, earning his third personal Italian title after the two obtained with Rugby Calvisano.

For 2014–15 Pro12 season, he was named Permit Player for Zebre. From 2020 to 2022 Scarsini played for Lyons Piacenza in Top12.

References

External links
It's Rugby France Profile
Eurosport Profile
F.I.R. Profile

1993 births
Italian rugby league players
People from Gemona del Friuli
Zebre Parma players
Petrarca Rugby players
Rugby union props
Living people
Rugby Lyons Piacenza players
Sportspeople from Friuli-Venezia Giulia